Pi Lambda Theta (ΠΛΘ) is one of three main education honor societies and professional associations for educators in the United States.

Basic information 
Pi Lambda Theta is both an honor society and professional association for educators. As an honor society, its purpose is to recognize persons of superior scholastic achievement and high potential for professional leadership. As a professional association, its purpose is to stimulate independent-thinking educators who can ask critical questions to improve educational policies and practices.

Pi Lambda Theta's mission is to honor outstanding educators and inspire their leadership on critical education issues. PLT extends membership to students majoring in education who demonstrate academic excellence, as well as to professional educators who have earned a PLT-recognized award such as certification by the National Board for Professional Teaching Standards in the United States.

Pi Lambda Theta is a wholly-owned subsidiary of PDK International, a professional association for educators.  As such, Pi Lambda Theta members may choose to participate in PDK during and after graduation, with programs within the field of education. Rather than a one-time fee like many pure honor societies, this combined honor/professional model requires annual dues.

Membership 
Pi Lambda Theta requires that candidates have a 3.5 GPA or higher.  Candidates are accepted from the following categories:

Undergraduate students with a minimum of 60 credit hours, recent graduates, or graduate students who intend to pursue a career in education; or
Current educators or education professionals/support staff who have completed at least a bachelor's degree.

The annual fee for membership in Pi Lambda Theta is $74.

History and governance 
Its Founders, their schools and eventual chapters were:
 Louise Nardin, University of Missouri, (Alpha chapter)
 Ruth Austin, Syracuse University, (Beta chapter)
 Helen Rhoda Hoopes, University of Kansas, (Gamma chapter)
 Iva Testerman Spangler, University of Kansas, (Gamma chapter)
 Mary Jane Chambers Dury, University of Pittsburgh, (Delta chapter)
 Katharine Foulke, University of Pittsburgh, (Delta chapter)
 Helen Larsen Stevens, University of Minnesota, (Epsilon chapter)
 Virginia Athen Noland, University of Washington, (Zeta chapter)
 Ruth Immel, University of Pennsylvania, (Eta chapter)

These local societies formed in response to the recent establishment of similar men's honor fraternities for education, with the oldest of the women's groups, at Missouri, dating to 1910, which is recognized as its founding year. From the start, organizers recognized the advantages of combining their efforts into a national organization. Through correspondence and some exchange of representatives, the seven learned of each other and their shared interests, culminating in an invitation by the Missouri group to meet in conference at Columbia, Missouri. From its early days the fraternity has opted for a model that combines aspects of an honor society (more stringent GPA requirements) with an ongoing professional advocacy program, intended to advance education as a profession.

By 1975 the restriction on men was lifted, and Pi Lambda Theta has been co-educational since that time.  

Members can be found in all 50 states and in many countries throughout the world.

Some time after 1990, Pi Lambda Theta became a member of the Phi Delta Kappa International family of education associations and is governed by the PDK International Board of Directors.

References

External links
Official website

Honor societies
Student organizations established in 1910
501(c)(3) organizations
Former members of Professional Fraternity Association
1910 establishments in Missouri